The 1925 Rice Owls football team was an American football team that represented Rice University in the Southwest Conference during the 1925 college football season. In its second season under head coach John Heisman, the team compiled a 4–4–1 record (1–2–1 against SWC opponents) and outscored opponents by a total of 85 to 79. The team played its home games at Rice Field in Houston.

Schedule

References

Rice
Rice Owls football seasons
Rice Owls football